Timo Saarelainen (born August 23, 1960) is a retired Finnish basketball player.  He was a member of the Finnish national basketball team for seven years and was a star college player at Brigham Young University (BYU) in the United States.

Saarelainen, a 6'6" small forward from Helsinki, played for Finland's national teams from 1978 to 1984, competing for Finland in the qualifying tournaments for the 1980 and 1984 Olympics.  He was Finland's leading scorer for four years.  He came to the United States in 1980 to pursue his degree at BYU.  While there he went to two NCAA tournaments and as a senior in 1985 was named the Western Athletic Conference player of the year.  That season he averaged 22 points and 4.5 rebounds per game for the Cougars.  For his BYU career, Saarelainen scored 932 points in 100 games.

Following his BYU career, Saarelainen was selected in the fifth round of the 1985 NBA Draft by the Los Angeles Lakers, but did not play in the league.  Saarelainen played six seasons for Helsingin NMKY of Korisliiga, Finland's top professional league.

References

External links 
Finnish League profile
Finnish National team record
BYU Stats

1960 births
Living people
BYU Cougars men's basketball players
Finnish men's basketball players
Finnish expatriate basketball people in the United States
Los Angeles Lakers draft picks
Small forwards
Sportspeople from Helsinki